The North Dakota State Board of Higher Education (NDSBHE) is the policy-setting body for the North Dakota University System in the U.S. state of North Dakota. The eight-member board includes seven citizen members and one student member. The citizen members serve four-year terms and the student member serves a one-year term. All members are appointed by the Governor of North Dakota. The board also includes a non-voting faculty advisor that is selected by the Council of College Faculties, and a non-voting staff advisor that is selected by the North Dakota Staff Senate.

Current members
Casey Ryan, President
Tim Mihalick, Vice President
Danita Bye
Jeffrey Volk
John Warford
Kevin Black
Nick Hacker
Sadie Hanson, Student Member
Lisa Montplaisir, Faculty Advisor
Michael Linnell, Staff Advisor

References

External links
North Dakota State Board of Higher Education website

Public education in North Dakota
State agencies of North Dakota